was a Japanese middle-distance runner. He competed in the men's 800 metres at the 1920 Summer Olympics.

References

1896 births
Year of death missing
Athletes (track and field) at the 1920 Summer Olympics
Japanese male middle-distance runners
Olympic athletes of Japan
Place of birth missing
20th-century Japanese people